The term JDF may refer to:

Forces
Jamaica Defence Force
Japan Self-Defense Forces

Other
Job Definition Format
Juvenile Diabetes Research Foundation, formerly known as the Juvenile Diabetes Foundation

People
Jason David Frank, American actor and martial artist.